Greatesttits is the eleventh album released by DIY home recording pioneer and one-man band R. Stevie Moore. It was the first official compact disc issued by Moore. The album is a compilation of previously released tracks from Moore's four vinyl issues on New Rose Records, Paris.

Track listing

 "Welcome to London" (:56) 
 "I Wanna Hit You" (1:57) 
 "Chantilly Lace" (2:25) 
 "One Moore Time" (2:14) 
 "Forecast" (2:00) 
 "Topic of Same" (4:23) 
 "His Latest Flame" (2:13) 
 "First-Hand" (2:25)   
 "Teen Routines" (2:21) 
 "Why Can't I Write a Hit?" (2:20) 
 "U. R. True" (2:35) 
 "Wayne Wayne (Go Away)" (4:23) 
 "Debbie" (4:00) 
 "I Hope That You Remember" (3:02) 
 "Part of the Problem" (3:43)   
 "Don't Let Me Go to the Dogs" (4:04)   
 "Why Should I Love You" (3:18) 
 "Along Comes Mary" (2:52) 
 "The Bodycount" (3:33) 
 "Hobbies Galore" (4:14) 
 "Cover of "Rolling Stone"" (4:25) 
 "You Always Want What You Don't Have" (3:52) 
 "The Whereabouts" (3:32) 
 "Diary" (3:23)

References

External links
 RSM's Greatesttits webpage

1990 albums
R. Stevie Moore albums
New Weird America albums